The 2002 OFC Nations Cup qualification tournament was a football competition that was played in March 2002 to determine the two of OFC's five lowest ranked members men's national teams to advanced to the 2002 OFC Nations Cup final tournament played in New Zealand in July 2002. The national teams of six OFC member associations entered the qualifying process. Cook Islands withdrew from the competition.

Qualified teams

Format
With the end of the Polynesian and Melanesian Cups between the 2000 and 2002 tournaments, (the two competitions formerly served a secondary function as qualifiers for the Oceania Nations Cup), a new format was created to decide the teams which would be accepted for the Nations Cup. Retaining their round-robin group qualifier style, the OFC this time chose to adopt the FIFA rankings to order all the entrants. With New Caledonia not yet a FIFA member, they were placed last by default. The lowest six teams were then made to compete for two places via a round-robin group stage, with the highest-placed two teams qualifying for the Oceania Nations Cup.

The Rankings of all the teams involved in the OFC Nations Cup are below. The positions were taken as of October, 2001, with the eleven ranked teams appearing in the following order:

Schedule
Below was the schedule of the 2002 OFC Nations Cup qualification.

Standings

Matches
Before the first group stage began, the  withdrew, resulting in the group stage being played between only five nations.

 and  progress to the second group stage.

Statistics

Goalscorers

References

qualification
OFC Nations Cup qualification